Ukrainian Armor is a manufacturer of personal protection equipment located in Kyiv, Ukraine.

History 
Ukrainian Armor was built on 19 February 2014 during Ukraine's Revolution of Dignity. The founders realized that Euromaidan self-defence forces catastrophically lacked bulletproof vests. Ukraine Armor begun as a start-up founded by 25 friends, including engineers.

During the confrontation in Eastern Ukraine, the demand for ammunition grew and construction workers, engineers and designers joined the company. The team began to investigate foreign expertise. Their costumers included the Azov Battalion, security enterprises and businessmen.

In 2015, production capacities expanded to the operating department of Aircraft development plant No 20. Production of bulletproof helmets was set up.

Products 
Ukrainian Armor currently produces:

 Military bulletproof vests of NIJ IIA, II, IIIA, III, IV protection levels.
 Bulletproof vests of concealable and semi-concealable types of NIJ IIA, II, IIIA protection levels.
 Bulletproof helmets of NIJ IIIA protection level, V50 720 m/s.
 Bulletproof ceramic plates, light pressed made of UHMWPE and aramid, tempered steel and titan.
 Soft ballistic fragments protection of 1of NIJ IIA, II, IIIA protection levels.
 Bulletproof vests for hunters.
 Bulletproof vests for military officers and police officers.
 Tactical ammunition: load bearing equipment, web gears, magazine carriers.
 Bulletproof vests for hunting and police dogs.

References

External links 
 
 

Ukrainian brands
Defence companies of Ukraine
Economy of Kyiv